Hering may refer to:

 Hering (surname)
 Hering son of Hussa (late 6th century-early 7th century), Bernician prince

Science
 Canals of Hering, or intrahepatic bile ductules, part of the outflow system from the liver
 
Hering–Breuer reflex, a reflex of the pulmonary stretch receptors
 Hering illusion, a geometrical-optical illusion
 Hering's law of equal innervation, a law of the physiology of vision
Hering's law of healing, a law of physical healing developed by Constantine Hering
 Hering's nerve, a nerve branch in the head and neck

Business
 Cia. Hering, a Brazilian textile and retail company

See also
 Häring, a surname
 Haring, a surname
 Harring, a surname
 Herring (disambiguation)